Piz Ela is a mountain in the Albula Alps, overlooking Bergün, in the Swiss canton of Graubünden. It is located in the center of the nature park Parc Ela.

There is a lake called Lai Grond to the south of Piz Ela.

References

External links

Piz Ela on Hikr

Mountains of the Alps
Alpine three-thousanders
Mountains of Switzerland
Mountains of Graubünden
Bergün Filisur
Surses